The International Bernese Ladies Cup (Swiss German: Internationaler Berner Damen Cup) is an annual bonspiel which was started in 1968 and became an event on the women's World Curling Tour in 2007. It is held every January at the Curlingbahn Allmend in Bern, Switzerland.

Champions (1968–2006)

Past champions (since 2007)

References

External links
2017 event site
Curlingbahn Allmend Bern Home Page

Women's World Curling Tour events
 
Sport in Bern
Champions Curling Tour events